Millie Laura Farrow (born 3 June 1996) is an English professional footballer who plays as a forward for North Carolina Courage. She has represented England on the under-19 and under-23 national teams.

Career
Farrow attended Itchen College in Southampton where she was part of the team who won the ECFA National Knockout Cup, scoring four goals in the final against Wyke College at the Bescot Stadium.

Chelsea
Farrow made her debut for Chelsea during the 2014 FA WSL season. Chelsea finished in second place with a  record.

Farrow returned for the 2015 FA WSL season and scored her first goal against Bristol City on 12 July 2015. She made two appearances for Chelsea during the regular season. The team finished in first place.

Bristol City 
Farrow went on loan to Bristol City in January 2016 ahead of the 2016 FA WSL season. She scored 11 goals in her 16 appearances for the team and helped secure a second-place result with a  record and promotion to FA WSL 1. Farrow scored a brace during the final game of the season against Oxford United helping Bristol City win 5–0.

Farrow signed permanently for Bristol City in January 2018, after her previous loan spell had been cut short by injury.

Reading
On 22 July 2018, Farrow joined Reading. On 8 June 2020, Reading announced that Farrow had left the club after her contract had expired.

Leicester City 
On 22 August 2020, FA Women's Championship club, Leicester City announced the signing of Millie Farrow ahead of the 2020–21 season, among seven other FA WSL players, as they embarked on their journey as a fully professional club.

Crystal Palace  
On 20 July 2021, FA Women's Championship club Crystal Palace announced the signing of Farrow ahead of the 2021–22 season. She scored her first goal in a 1–1 draw with newly promoted Sunderland.

The following season she signed for London City Lionesses but left without making a competitive appearance. She then joined National Women's Soccer League side North Carolina Courage on a deal until the end of the 2023 season.

International career
Farrow has represented England on the under-19 and under-23 national teams.

Personal life
Farrow has struggled with obsessive compulsive disorder throughout her career. In 2023, she released a book called Brave Enough Not To Quit, which details how she deals with her OCD and anxiety.

Honours 
 with Chelsea
 FA WSL 1 Runner-up: 2014
 FA WSL 1 Winner: 2015
 FA Women's Cup Winner: 2014–15
 FA Women's Cup Runner-up: 2015–16

 with Bristol City
 FA WSL 2 Runner-up: 2015

with Leicester City
 FA Women’s Championship: 2020–21

References

Further reading
 Caudwell, Jayne (2011), Women's Football in the UK: Continuing with Gender Analyses, Routledge, 
 Grainey, Timothy (2012), Beyond Bend It Like Beckham: The Global Phenomenon of Women's Soccer, University of Nebraska Press, 
 Scraton, S., Magee, J., Caudwell, J. (2008), Women, Football and Europe: Histories, Equity and Experience (Ifi) (Vol 1), Meyer & Meyer Fachverlag und Buchhandel GmbH, 
 Stewart, Barbara (2012), Women's Soccer: The Passionate Game, Greystone Books, 
 Williams, Jean (2003), A Game for Rough Girls?: A History of Women's Football in Britain, Routledge,

External links 
 
 Chelsea player profile
 Bristol City player profile
 
 

1996 births
Living people
Women's Super League players
Bristol Academy W.F.C. players
English women's footballers
Women's association football forwards
Chelsea F.C. Women players
Footballers from Portsmouth
Women's Championship (England) players
Crystal Palace F.C. (Women) players
Leicester City W.F.C. players
Reading F.C. Women players
London City Lionesses players
North Carolina Courage players
Expatriate soccer players in the United States
English expatriate sportspeople in the United States
English expatriate footballers